Karolína Plíšková defeated Varvara Lepchenko in the final, 6–3, 6–7(5–7), 6–2 to win the women's singles tennis title at the 2014 Korea Open.

Agnieszka Radwańska was the defending champion, but lost to Lepchenko in the quarterfinals.

Seeds

Draw

Finals

Top half

Bottom half

Qualifying

Seeds

Qualifiers

Qualifying draw

First qualifier

Second qualifier

Third qualifier

Fourth qualifier

References

External links
Main draw
Qualifying draw

2014 Singles
2014 WTA Tour
2014 in South Korean tennis